Naresh Kumar HN is an Indian film director and a screenwriter who works in Kannada cinema. He gained following on his directorial debut First Rank Raju (2015), followed by his second movie Raju Kannada Medium (2018). At present, On the story of First Rank Raju, He is set to make his debut direction for the Tollywood Industry with the remake of First Rank Raju in Telugu all set to release in June 2019.

Early life 
Naresh Kumar HN was born in 1987 at rural Bangalore, Dodaballapura Taluk to Narshima Murthy and Roopakala. Naresh graduated with a degree in engineering from PESIT in 2008. He obtained a Diploma in Film Direction at KANFIDA (Karnataka Film Director Association).

Career 
Naresh worked as an Assistant Director to Master Anand , Ramesh Aravind  and Madhu Chandru. In 2015, Naresh directed his debut film First Rank Raju Kannada which saw a star cast of Sadhu Kokila , Anant Nag, Achyut Rao and Gurunandan. The movie was screened for 100 days and was well received by the audience. In the year 2018 he directed his second movie Raju Kannada Medium which saw Kannada movie star Kicha Sudeep be a part of it along with Gurunandan and Avantika Shetty which was screened for 75 days. Following the success of his movies, He is replicating the First Rank Raju story in Telugu for the audience of tollywood as 1st Rank Raju. He has also made appreances in the famous Kannada version of the Bigg Boss hosted by Kicha Sudeep.

Filmography

Awards and nominations 

 Won the Best Dialogue writer for 1st Rank Raju at the Times Of India - KAFTA Awards.
 Nominated for BIFFES film festival for Raju Kannada Medium.

References

External links 

 Naresh Kumar HN on BookMyShow
 Teaser Launch: Photos of Naresh Kumar HN and producer Manjunath

Kannada film directors
Living people
Indian film directors
Year of birth missing (living people)